Barton is a suburb of Oxford, England on the city's eastern edge. Barton is just outside the Northern By-Pass Road, north of Headington Roundabout where North Way (part of the A40 road) and the Eastern By-pass (part of the A4142 road) meet London Road (part of the A40 to the east and A420 road to the west).

History
The course of a Roman road between Dorchester on Thames and Alchester passes through Barton. Barton Manor is a 17th-century listed building built of ashlar-faced Cotswold stone. Barton was rural until the middle decades of the 20th century. It now has predominantly semi-detached, brick-built houses, but there are also significant numbers of pre-fabricated dwellings and small three or four storey flat and maisonette blocks. Much of the housing was built as social housing, and remains in Oxford City Council ownership. The Church of England parish church of St Mary was built in 1958. Oxford Crematorium is off Bayswater Road just north of Barton. It was opened in 1939 by the Oxford Crematorium Company.

Amenities
Barton Leisure Centre, which includes a swimming pool and gym, is on Waynflete Road. The Barton Neighbourhood Centre provides a focal point for community activities. The Barton Community Association, which was founded more than 60 years ago, is the local residents' association. Barton has two schools: Bayards Hill Primary School and the Ormerod School, both in Waynflete Road. A new housing estate, Barton Park, consisting of 885 homes, a primary school, a community hub, sports facilities and park, is being built northwest of Barton.

References

External links

Barton Community Association
Barton Swimming Pool

Areas of Oxford
Housing estates in Oxfordshire
Villages in Oxfordshire